The Razzie Award for Worst New Star was an award presented at the annual Golden Raspberry Awards to the worst new actor or actress of the previous year.

History
From 1982 to 1989 and again from 1991 to 1999. The category has since been discontinued.

Awards and nominations

1982–1989

1991–1999

See also
Golden Globe Award for New Star of the Year – Actress
Golden Globe Award for New Star of the Year – Actor

References

External links
 Official Razzie website

Golden Raspberry Awards by category
Awards established in 1982
Awards disestablished in 1999